Notiosorex is a genus of shrew from the subfamily Soricinae.

History
Notiosorex shrews have a fossil history that extends to the Miocene (i.e., mid-Hemphillian). The geographic distribution of the genus has always been in the southwestern United States and northern Mexico.

Species 
There are four described extant species of Notiosorex:

 Cockrum's gray shrew (N. cockrumi) 
 Crawford's gray shrew (N. crawfordi)
 Large-eared gray shrew (N. evotis)
 Villa's gray shrew (N. villai)
(N. tataticuli)

There are several extinct species of Notiosorex described from the fossil record:

 N. dalquesti
 N. harrisi
 N. jacksoni
 N. repenningi

References

 
Mammal genera